Anders Gloeersen (born 22 May 1986) is a Norwegian cross-country skier who has competed since 2005. He has five World Cup victories, earning four of them in the individual sprint events (2007, 2008, 2010, 2013), and one in a 15 km freestyle race in Davos (2014). He won a bronze medal in the 15 km freestyle race in Falun the next year, and replaced Sundby in the third leg of the relay. His effort in the relay helped secure another win, Norway's eighth relay victory in a row.

Cross-country skiing results
All results are sourced from the International Ski Federation (FIS).

Olympic Games

World Championships
 2 medals – (1 gold, 1 bronze)

World Cup

Season standings

Individual podiums
 5 victories – (5 ) 
 15 podiums – (13 , 2 )

Team podiums
 3 victories – (2 , 1 ) 
 7 podiums – (3 , 4 )

References

External links

 
 
 

1986 births
Living people
Norwegian male cross-country skiers
Cross-country skiers at the 2014 Winter Olympics
Olympic cross-country skiers of Norway
FIS Nordic World Ski Championships medalists in cross-country skiing
Skiers from Oslo